Walther Ludwig Julius Kossel (4 January 1888 – 22 May 1956) was a German physicist known for his theory of the chemical bond (ionic bond/octet rule), Sommerfeld–Kossel displacement law of atomic spectra, the Kossel-Stranski model for crystal growth, and the Kossel effect.  Walther was the son of Albrecht Kossel who won the Nobel Prize in Physiology or Medicine in 1910.

Career
Kossel was born in Berlin, and began studies at the University of Heidelberg in 1906, but was at the University of Berlin during 1907 and 1908.  In 1910, he became assistant to Philipp Lenard, who was also his thesis advisor.  Kossel was awarded his Ph.D. in 1910, and he stayed on as assistant to Leonard until 1913.

In 1913, the year in which Niels Bohr introduced the Bohr model of the atom, Kossel went to the University of Munich as assistant to Arnold Sommerfeld, under whom he did his Habilitation.  Under Sommerfeld, Munich was a theoretical center for the developing atomic theory, especially from the interpretation of atomic spectra. Kossel worked with Bohr and Sommerfeld on the Bohr-Sommerfeld model of the atom.   In 1916, Kossel put forth his theory of the ionic chemical bond (octet rule), also independently advanced in the same year by Gilbert N. Lewis. In papers published in 1914, 1916, and 1920, Kossel was the first to explain the theory of absorption limits in x-ray spectra.  The edge appears at a critical frequency where absorption of the radiation largely begins with the resultant ejection of photoelectrons.  In 1919, Kossel and Sommerfeld explained the similarity of the atomic spectra of neutral atoms, of atomic number Z, and singly ionized atoms, of atomic number Z + 1, which became known as the Sommerfeld–Kossel displacement law.  In 1920, Kossel explained another phenomenon of x-ray spectra.  Under high resolution spectroscopy, the absorption edge has structure.  He attributed this to absorption of radiation by electrons which are not ejected from matter as photoelectrons, but are “kicked up” to higher, unoccupied, bound electron energy levels.  In early years, this was known as “Kossel structure.”

In 1921, Kossel took an appointment as ordinarius professor of theoretical physics at the University of Kiel.  In 1928, he put forth his kinetic theory of crystal growth, which became known as the Kossel-Stranski model – Iwan N. Stranski  independently proposed the same model.

In 1932, Kossel took the appointment as ordinarius professor of theoretical physics at the Technische Hochschule Danzig.  During his tenure there in 1934, he discovered x-ray lattice interference of spherical waves in crystals during the bombardment of single-crystal copper with a high-energy electron beam.

In 1933 he signed the Vow of allegiance of the Professors of the German Universities and High-Schools to Adolf Hitler and the National Socialistic State.

In 1944, he was awarded the Max-Planck medal by the Deutsche Physikalische Gesellschaft.

In 1945, Kossel became professor of theoretical physics and director of the Physics Institute at the University of Tübingen, where he was granted emeritus status in 1953.

Kossel died in Tübingen, and is buried, as is his father, Albrecht, in the Bergfriedhof, Heidelberg.

Selected bibliography
 Walther Kossel Bemerkung zur Absorption homogener Röntgenstrahlen, Verh. D. Deutsch. Phys Ges (2) 16 898-909 (1914). Received 27 September 1914, published in issue No. 20 of 30 October 1914.  As cited in Mehra, Volume 1, Part 2, 2001, p. 795.
 Walther Kossel Bemerkung zur Absorption homogener Röntgenstrahlen. II, Verh. D. Deutsch. Phys Ges (2) 16 953-963 (1914). Received 23 October 1914, published in issue No. 22 of 30 November 1914.  As cited in Mehra, Volume 5, Part 2, 2001, p. 919.
 Walther Kossel Bemerkung zum Seriencharakter der Röntgenstrahlen, Verh. D. Deutsch. Phys Ges (2) 18 339-359 (1916). Received 31 August 1916, published in issue No. 15-18 of 30 September 1916.  As cited in Mehra, Volume 5, Part 2, 2001, p. 919.
 Walther Kossel, “Uber Molkulbildung als Frage der Atombau”, Ann. Phys., 1916, 49:229-362.

Notes

References
 Borisenko, Victor E. and Stefano Ossicini What is What in the Nanoworld: A Handbook on Nanoscience and Nanotechnology(Wiley-VCH, 2004) 
 Cao, Gouzhong Nanostructures and Nanomaterials: Synthesis, Properties, and Applications (Imperial College Press, 2004) 
 Gerhard Herzberg translated from German with the help of the author by J. W. T. Spinks Atomic Spectra and Atomic Structure (Dover, 1945)
 Mehra, Jagdish, and Helmut Rechenberg The Historical Development of Quantum Theory. Volume 1 Part 2 The Quantum Theory of Planck, Einstein, Bohr and Sommerfeld 1900 – 1925: Its Foundation and the Rise of Its Difficulties. (Springer, 2001) 
 Mehra, Jagdish, and Helmut Rechenberg The Historical Development of Quantum Theory.  Volume 5 Erwin Schrödinger and the Rise of Wave Mechanics. Part 2 Schrödinger in Vienna and Zurich 1887-1925. (Springer, 2001)  
 Pauling, Linus The Nature of the Chemical Bond and the Structure of Molecules and Crystals: An Introduction to Modern Structural Chemistry (Cornell, 1960)
 White, Harvey Elliott Introduction to Atomic Spectra (McGraw-Hill, 1934)

1888 births
1956 deaths
20th-century German physicists
Scientists from Berlin
People from the Province of Brandenburg
Quantum physicists
Winners of the Max Planck Medal